Franklin Creek State Natural Area is an Illinois state park on  in Lee County, Illinois, United States. Franklin Creek State Natural Area was dedicated in 1982, making it the 24th nature preserve in Illinois.

References

State parks of Illinois
Protected areas of Lee County, Illinois
Protected areas established in 1970
State Natural Areas of Illinois
1970 establishments in Illinois